Richard Leo McCann (May 27, 1944 – September 3, 2013) was a Canadian ice hockey player who played 43 games in the National Hockey League with the Detroit Red Wings between 1967 and 1974. Internationally he played for the Canadian national team at the 1966 World Championships.

Career statistics

Regular season and playoffs

International

References

External links
 

1944 births
2013 deaths
Baltimore Clippers players
Canadian expatriate ice hockey players in England
Canadian ice hockey centres
Detroit Red Wings players
Fort Worth Wings players
Ice hockey people from Ontario
London Lions (ice hockey) players
Michigan Tech Huskies men's ice hockey players
Memphis Wings players
New Haven Nighthawks players
Sportspeople from Hamilton, Ontario
Tidewater Wings players
Virginia Wings players